"Hollywood Square Dance" is a popular song written by Charlie Hayes and Paul Weirick. The song was a 1950 hit for Sammy Kaye with vocal refrain by Laura Leslie, reaching the top position on Australia's singles chart.

Charts

References

1949 songs
1950 singles